Two naval vessels of Japan have been named Asagumo (朝雲), which translates to "Morning Clouds".

She was launched in 1937, completed in 1938, sunk in 1944, and struck in 1945.
She was launched in 1966 and decommissioned in 1998.

See also 
 Asagumo - Moon rover developed by Spacebit

References 

Japanese Navy ship names